The Yarrawonga Football Netball Club, nicknamed the Pigeons, is an Australian rules football and netball club based in the town of Yarrawonga, Victoria located on the Murray River.

Club history

The Yarrawonga teams have been competing in the Ovens & Murray Football League since 1930.

Prior to this the club had played in a line association that was based along the Benalla to Yarrawonga railway line. This association had frequent name changes dating back to 1889.

The 2010 decade saw the Pigeons play the most finals of any Club in the Ovens and Murray (28).

's Tom Lonergan played for Yarrawonga before moving to Melbourne and being drafted into the Australian Football League. Former Carlton full forward Brendan Fevola played for Yarrawonga from 2012 until 2015.

In 2018 the club had three players drafted to the AFL: Ely Smith, James Jordon and Finbar O'Dwyer.

In Round 2, Easter Sunday 2020 at Mulwala, Xavier Leslie was due to play his 300th Senior O&MFNL Game for the Pigeons. He will be the club's only player to achieve such a feat.

Premierships
 Benalla – Yarrawonga Line Football Association (7): 
1907, 1908, 1921, 1925, 1926, 1927, 1930
 Yarrawonga & Border Football Association (2): 
1910, 1919
Ovens & Murray Football League (5): 
1959, 1989, 2006, 2012, 2013

References

External links

Official website
Official website

Ovens & Murray Football League clubs
1889 establishments in Australia
Sports clubs established in 1889
Australian rules football clubs established in 1889
Netball teams in Victoria (Australia)